Cyclamen parviflorum, the small-flowered cyclamen is a flowering perennial plant growing from a tuber, native to high elevations in the Pontic Mountains of northern Turkey. It is the smallest cyclamen species and the only one native to alpine tundra.

Cyclamen coum has similar flowers, but grows mostly at lower elevations. Where the two species are found together, they do not seem to hybridize.

The Latin specific epithet parviflorum means "with small flowers".

Distribution
In the lower-elevation part of its range, it inhabits grassy slopes, rocky places, and oriental spruce forests, sometimes beneath Rhododendron luteum.

Description
In the wild, the tuber sits  underground.

The leaves are wider than long. The leaf color is dark green above and deep red below. Unlike other species, such as the similar Cyclamen coum, Cyclamen parviflorum is never variegated with silver.

The flowers are fragrant and have five petals, pink to purple with a dark purple marking on the nose, short and rounded as in Cyclamen coum. They lack the white or pink "eye" below the dark marking that is present in Cyclamen coum.

Varieties

Cyclamen parviflorum has two varieties.

Cyclamen parviflorum var. parviflorum has petals bent upwards (4–8 mm, - inch long). It inhabits open habitats at higher elevations.

Cyclamen parviflorum var. subalpinum has petals bent outwards, not up (8–11 mm, - inch long), and twisted like the blades of a propeller, similar to Cyclamen alpinum. It inhabits densely shaded areas in lower-elevation woodland.

References

External links

Cyclamen Society — 1987 Cyclamen Society Expedition
Cyclamen: a guide for gardeners, horticulturists, and botanists by C. Grey-Wilson — Google Books

CalPhotos
IPNI Listing
Kew Plant List

parviflorum